The Sahrawi National Council (SNC) or Sahrawi Parliament is the legislature of the Sahrawi Arab Democratic Republic. Its structure and competences are guided by the Constitution of the Sahrawi Arab Democratic Republic (SADR). The present speaker since 2020 is Hamma Salama.

It was first created by Polisario Front members and Sahrawi tribal notables  as the Provisionary National Council in April or November 1975, after the proclamation of Guelta Zemmur. On February 27, 1976, POLISARIO leader El-Ouali Mustapha Sayed announced that the Council had declared the creation of the Sahrawi Arab Democratic Republic, of which it became the first parliament. On the POLISARIO's III General Popular Congress (August 26–30, 1976), a newly elected membership was formally installed as the Sahrawi National Council.

The SNC is a unicameral body, with 53 seats, elected every two years (since the XIII POLISARIO Congress) at the General Popular Congresses by delegates from the Sahrawi refugee camps at Tindouf province, Algeria, supplemented by representatives of the Sahrawi People's Liberation Army and the civil society organizations (UJSARIO, UNMS, UGTSARIO). In the last election (2012), 35% of the parliamentarians were women. It usually convenes in Tifariti, at the Liberated Territories of Western Sahara, but on occasion also in the refugee camps.

Among the reforms enacted by the SNC is the abolishment of death penalty. In 1999, the SNC caused the fall of then Prime Ministers Mahfoud Ali Beiba government through a motion of no-confidence. The powers of the SNC were substantially expanded in the 1991 constitutional reforms of the SADR, and has since been further enhanced (last in 1999).

In its last election (2012), 158 candidates competed for 52 seats in 11 constituencies.

List of presidents of the Sahrawi National Council 
Below is a list of presidents of the Sahrawi Provisional National Council:

Below is a list of presidents of the Sahrawi National Council:

|-
! style="background-color:#E9E9E9;text-align:left;vertical-align:top;" |Party
! style="background-color:#E9E9E9;text-align:right;" |Seats
|-
|Popular Front for the Liberation of Saguia el-Hamra and Río de Oro
| style="vertical-align:top;" |53
|-
|style="background-color:#E9E9E9"|Total
|width="30" style="text-align:right;background-color:#E9E9E9"|53
|}

International membership 
The Sahrawi National Council is a member of the Pan-African Parliament.
Since October 14, 2011, the SNC is a permanent observer member of the Andean Parliament.

References

See also 

2020 Sahrawi legislative election
Politics of the Sahrawi Arab Democratic Republic
List of legislatures by country

Politics of the Sahrawi Arab Democratic Republic
National legislatures
Western Sahara
Tifariti